Frías is a city in Argentina, located southwest of the province of Santiago del Estero, near the border with the province of Catamarca, and is the head of the Choya Department. It is located on the banks of the river Albigasta at coordinates: 28 ° 38'60 "S 65 ° 09'05" W.

The city was founded on September 24, 1874.

Population 
It has 26,649 inhabitants (INDEC, 2010), representing a significant increase in 22,048 inhabitants (INDEC, 1999) the previous census. This magnitude is positioned as the third Agglomeration in the province. Before being planned as a city with the name Frías, it was known by the name of Villa Únzaga, when it was a railway stop. Frías, now known as "the city of friendship," because of its warmth towards its visitors, is experiencing population growth closely linked to the start-up firms in the new industrial area a few kilometers from the city that will  generate many jobs and improve the lifestyle of the city.

Trivia 
It is the first place where a marriage between persons of the same sex occurred in Argentina, July 29 of 2010.

References

Populated places in Santiago del Estero Province
Santiago del Estero Province
Cities in Argentina
Argentina